The African Police Medal for Meritorious Service was a medal awarded to non-European police officers in British African colonies.  Awarded from 1915-1938, the medal was replaced by the Colonial Police Medal and the Colonial Police Long Service Medal.

Appearance
The African Police Medal for Meritorious Service is circular, of silver.  The obverse bears a crowned and uniformed effigy of George V surrounded by the inscription GEORGIVS V REX ET IND : IMP :.  The reverse depict the Tudor Crown surmounted by a crowned lion encircled by a wreath tied at the base.  Surrounding the central design is the inscription FOR MERITORIOUS SERVICE IN THE POLICE • AFRICA •.

The medal is suspended from a claw suspension with a ring through its ribbon.  The ribbon is yellow with edges of red.

See also
 Police Long Service and Good Conduct Medal

References

External links

Civil awards and decorations of the United Kingdom
Law enforcement awards and honors
Awards established in 1915
Long and Meritorious Service Medals of Britain and the Commonwealth
Awards disestablished in 1938
Law enforcement in Africa
British colonisation in Africa